Very few Elder Futhark inscriptions in the Gothic language have been found in the territory historically settled by the Goths (Wielbark culture, Chernyakhov culture). Due to the early Christianization of the Goths, the Gothic alphabet replaced runes by the mid-4th century.

There are about a dozen candidate inscriptions, and  only three of them are widely accepted to be of Gothic origin: the gold ring of Pietroassa, bearing a votive inscription, part of a larger treasure found in the Romanian Carpathians, and two spearheads inscribed with what is probably the weapon's name, one found in the  Ukrainian Carpathians, and the other in eastern Germany, near the Oder.

Ring of Pietroassa

A gold ring (necklace) was found  in 1837 in Pietroassa (recte Pietroasele, south-east Romania, Buzău County), dated to ca. AD 400, bearing an Elder Futhark inscription of 15 runes. The ring was stolen in 1875, and clipped in two with pliers by a Bucharest goldsmith. It was recovered, but the 7th rune is now destroyed:
 (gutani [?] wi hailag).

In pre-1875 drawings and descriptions it was read as othala, gutaniowi hailag, interpreted as either gutanio wi hailag "sacred to the gothic women", or gutan-iowi hailag  "sacred to the Jove of the Goths" (Loewe 1909; interpreted as Thunraz), or gutani o[thala] wi hailag  "sacred inheritance of the Goths" (gutani is the genitive plural, for Ulfilan  (gutane).

The identity of the 7th rune as othala has since been called into question, but a photograph taken for London's Arundel Society before it was vandalised has recently been republished and the damaged rune is clearly an ᛟ (Mees 2004). How to interpret gutanio remains a matter of some dispute among runologists, however (Nedoma 2003).

Spearhead of Kovel

The head of a lance, found in 1858 Suszyczno, 30 km from Kovel, Ukraine, dated to the early 3rd century.

The spearhead measures 15.5 cm with a maximal width of 3.0 cm. Both sides of the leaf were inlaid with silver symbols. The inscription notably runs right to left, reading tilarids, interpreted as "thither rider" or more likely, as suggested by Prof. Johannes Hoops (Reallexikon der germanischen Altertumskunde, Volume 17), "Ziel-Reiter" (mod. German: "target rider" = sure hitter, perhaps a case of wishful thinking), the name either of a warrior, or of the spear itself. It is identified as East Germanic (Gothic) because of the nominative -s (in contrast to Proto-Norse -z).
The t and d are closer to the Latin alphabet than to the classical Elder Futhark, as it were <>.

An 1880 casting of the spearhead is exhibited in Berlin, an 1884 casting in Warsaw. The original was looted by Nazi archaeologists from its Polish owner in 1939 and it was lost altogether at the end of World War II.

Spearhead of Dahmsdorf-Müncheberg 

Spindle whorl of Letcani
Spindle whorl found in Lețcani, Romania, dated to the 4th century.
 (adonsufhe :rango:)

Buckle of Szabadbattyan
Silver buckle found in Szabadbattyán, Hungary, dated to the early 5th century, perhaps referring to the "Mærings" or Ostrogoths.
 (mari͡ŋgs)

See also
List of runestones

References

Marstrander, Carl, 'De gotiske runeminnesmaerker', Norsk tidskrift for sprogvidenskap 3 (1929), 25-157.
Ebbinghaus, Ernst, 'The question of Visigothic runic inscriptions re-examined', General Linguistics 30 (1990), 207-14.
Dietrich, Franz E.C., De inscriptionibus duabus Runicis ad Gothorum gentem relatis (Marburg: Elwert, 1861).
Loewe, Richard, 'Der Goldring von Pietroassa', Indogermanische Forschungen 26 (1909), 203-8. 
Graf, Heinz-Joachim, 'Gutanio wi hailag oder Gutaniom hailag? - Zur Lesung des Ringes von Pietroasa', Germanisch-Romanische Monatsschrift 31 (1943), 128-29.
Mees, Bernard, Runo-Gothica: The runes and the origin of Wulfila's script, Die Sprache 43 (2002/3 [publ. 2004]), 55-79.
Nedoma, Robert. 'Pietroassa, § 2. Runologisches', in Reallexikon der Germanischen Altertumskunde, vol. 23 (2003), pp. 155–58.

Elder Futhark inscriptions
Germanic archaeological artifacts
Runic
Byzantine Empire-related inscriptions